This is a list of confederations.

Historic

References

Confederations
Confederations